The 2016 Women's Pan-American Volleyball Cup was the 15th edition of the annual women's volleyball tournament. It was held in Santo Domingo, Dominican Republic from 2 July to 10 July. Twelve teams competed in the tournament, won by the Dominican Republic when they defeated 3-2 to Puerto Rico. The United States claimed the bronze medal and Dominican Republic athlete Brayelin Martínez was awarded Most Valuable Player.

Pools composition

Venue
Ricardo Arias Gymnasium, Santo Domingo
San Carlos Pavilion, Santo Domingo

Pool standing procedure
 Number of matches won
 Match points
 Points ratio
 Sets ratio
 Result of the last match between the tied teams

Match won 3–0: 5 match points for the winner, 0 match points for the loser
Match won 3–1: 4 match points for the winner, 1 match point for the loser
Match won 3–2: 3 match points for the winner, 2 match points for the loser

Preliminary round
All times are Atlantic Standard Time (UTC−04:00)

Group A

Group B

Final round

Championship bracket

5th–10th places bracket

11th place

5th-10th Classification

Quarterfinals

9th place

5th-8th Classification

Semifinals

7th place

5th place

3rd place

Final

Final standing

Individual awards

Most Valuable Player
  Brayelin Martínez
Best Setter
  Alexandra Muñoz
Best Outside Hitters
  Madison Kingdon
  Brayelin Martínez
Best Middle Blockers
  Annerys Vargas
  Rhamat Alhassan
Best Opposite
  Karina Ocasio
Best Scorer
  Kenny Moreno
Best Server
  Micha Hancock
Best Libero
  Brenda Castillo
Best Digger
  Brenda Castillo
Best Receiver
  Brenda Castillo

References

Women's Pan-American Volleyball Cup
Pan-American Volleyball Cup
International volleyball competitions hosted by the Dominican Republic
2016 in Dominican Republic women's sport
Sport in Santo Domingo